All Stars is a 1997 Dutch sports comedy film drama, which was the base for the Emmy Award-winning television show of the same name. Directed by Jean van de Velde. Together with Mischa Alexander he was also responsible for the script. The film premièred on 2 May 1997. The sequel Old Stars was released in 2011. In 2004, the film was remade in Britain as Things to Do Before You're 30.

Cast
 Antonie Kamerling as Hero
 Danny de Munk as Bram
 Daniël Boissevain as Johnny
 Thomas Acda as Willem
 Peter Paul Muller as Mark
 Plien van Bennekom as Sas
 Raymi Sambo as Paual
 Nora Mullens as Taxi chauffeur
 Kasper van Kooten as Peter
 Alfred van den Heuvel as Scheids #1
 Isa Hoes as Roos
 Joan Royé as Joan

External links
 
 
 

1997 films
1990s sports comedy films
1990s Dutch-language films
Films directed by Jean van de Velde
Dutch association football films
Dutch sports comedy films
Films shot in the Netherlands
1997 comedy films